George Lees may refer to:

 George Lees (footballer) (1924–1988), English amateur footballer who played for the Danish side Boldklubben Frem
 George Lees (baseball) (1895–1980), Major League Baseball catcher
 George Martin Lees (1898–1955), British soldier and geologist
 George Harmon Lees, mayor of Hamilton, Ontario, 1911–1912